Quinton Kyle Hoover (born 1996) is an American YouTuber, creator and proprietor of the YouTube channel and web series Quinton Reviews. Hoover produces video essays on various topics, usually pop culture. His best-known work includes his coverage of the Garfield franchise and a series of hours-long videos covering iCarly and its spin-offs.

YouTube career 
From 2019 to 2020, Hoover published two videos detailing his discovery of archived copies of Jim Davis's past work Jon, a precursor to Garfield. Hoover traveled to Muncie, Indiana, in order to get scans of the historical strips, and published a video about his trip on the channel.

In June 2021, Hoover published a five-hour video called "iBinged iCarly", with a recap of the series with his own commentary. He also published a video with a discussion on the career and works of YouTuber Lucas Cruikshank, who starred in an episode of iCarly, and a series of further videos on iCarly and its related series Victorious.

References 

1996 births
American YouTubers
Video essayists
Living people
YouTube critics and reviewers
Commentary YouTubers